Blepharomastix strigivenalis is a moth in the family Crambidae. It was described by George Hampson in 1918. It is found in Ecuador.

The wingspan is about 16 mm. The forewings are whitish suffused with ochreous. The costal edge is black towards the base and there is a black spot at the base of the cell, as well as a subbasal black spot on the inner margin. The antemedial line is blackish with a black spot at the costa. The hindwings are whitish, suffused with fuscous brown and with a blackish terminal line.

References

Moths described in 1918
Blepharomastix